Bahadurganj is a Municipality located of Zahurabad pargama of the Kasimabad Tehsil in Ghazipur district of Uttar Pradesh, India. Bahadurganj is located one the banks of Tamsa and Bhainsahi rivers.

History
Bahadurganj before named as Abdulpur was established by Nawab Sheikh Abdullah in year 1742, who was a Nawab of Ghazipur and son of Nawab Qasim Khan, Nawab of Qasimabad. He also served as a minister in court of Mughal emperor Farrukhsiyar and Saadat Ali Khan of Awadh. He was a relative of Rustam Ali , a Nizam of Banaras and Murtza Khan a Mughal minister. He also build Qasimbad fort after his father death in 1739. Fazal Ali again became the nawab till 1757. He then became immensely powerful and his estate was spread over 1647 villages. His estate remained in the hands of his family till 1788 but then it got divided and got in the control of Sarkar of Banaras. Nawab Azim Ali Khan was a nephew of Fazal Ali and grandson of Sheikh Abdullah who then received a pension of rupees one lakh. Azim Khan's family then migrated to Bahadurganj establishing a new capital of Zamindari estate.

They were two brothers named as Nawab Abdul Khan and Nawab Bahadur Shah Khan. Their family setteld at the original house of Abdulpur and then Nawab Bahadur Shah established a Bazar after his name know known as Bahdurganj. The geographical area of the village was 686 acres in year 1900 and it had many nearby villages under its zamindari. The place where their family lives  is respectively knon as Das ana and Chah ana and was before a fortified place.

After, some years more families migrated to the Abdulpur and Bahadurganj. The Bhadurganj market then got divided in four parts name as Bahadurganj, Puraniganj, Imamganj and Dakhinganj.

Location
Bahadurganj is located 12 km from Mau and about 42 km from Ghazipur. It is located at the southern bank of the Tamsa River.

Religions
The major religious groups are Muslims and Hindu, constituting 57% and 44.8% of the population respectively.

Local culture
Major festivals in Bahadurganj include Ram Navami, Mawlid, and Muharram Durga, which occur annually. Celebrations are also organized at Dashahara, Eid-ul-Adha, Eid-ul-Fitr, Holi, Ramzan-ul-Mubarak, Diwali, Raksha Bandhan, Shab-e-Barat, Christmas, and Easter, as well as the national holidays of Independence Day and Republic Day.

Despite the lack of a major Shiite community in the town, the month of Muharram is celebrated by some. On the tenth day of Muharram, the ritual of Ashura is held on the east side of the town. On the banks of the Tamsa River, which is also called the Dhobi Ghat, is the nearby village Rasulpur, through a Tujia river. There are three tahas of this town. People start coming here in the afternoon, and the three wooden equals of the town also go. In this town, people from all religions gather in celebration of different festivals.

Demographics
As of the 2011 India census, Bahadurganj had 13 wards and a population of 22068. 51.56% of the population is male; 48.44% is female. Bahadurganj has an average literacy rate of 71.26%, higher than the state average of 67.68%. The literacy rate is 78.01% among men and 64.08% among women. 16.80% of the population is under 6 years of age.

The State Bank Of India, Union Bank of India, District Cooperative Bank, and Sub Post Office provide banking services and ATM facilities. Sub Post Office is now providing CBS facilities.

Chairman
The first Nagar Palika election was held in 1942.

List Of Chairmen
Nabedad Khan, (CPI) (1942–1947)
Gulab Chand, CPI (1947–1952)
Abul Khan, CPI (1952–1957)
Nijamuddin Khan, CPI (1957–1962)
Rafiullah Khan, CPI (1962–1967)
Habbibullah Khan, CPI (1967–1977)
Makshood Khan, BSP (1977–1982)
Shanti Verma, BJP (1982–1987)
Amina Abdullah Raini, BJP (1987–1992)
Reyaj Ahmad ANSARI, BSP (1992–1997)
Reyaj Ahmad Ansari, Samajwadi Party (1997–2002)
Reyaj Ahmad Ansari, Quami Ekta Dal (2002–2007)
Nikhat Parveen, BSP (2007-2011)
REYAZ AHMAD ANSARI (2011 - 2015) 
REYAZ AHMAD ANSARI (2015-2020) 
NIKHAT PARVEEN CURRENT CHAIRMAN

Weather

Neighbourhoods
Bahadurganj
Puraniganj
Bhumihar Toli
Dakinganj
Chhawani
Abdulpur (Das ana and Chah ana)
Sadar Bazar
Takia WM.
Imlitar
Kasab Tola
Jama Masjid
Chowk Dwar
Mallah Toli
Mahua Tar
Barwa Tar
Gudadi Bazar (Ghas Bazar)
Darji Tola
Anar Masjid
Imam Ganj
Nayi Basti
Dumdera
Pattigarh (Gadhwa Par)
Chandika Sthan

See also
 Qasimabad
 Zahurabad
 Bhainsahi River

References

Cities and towns in Ghazipur district